Alan Hozanovych Aussi (born 30 June 2001) is a Ukrainian professional footballer who plays as a defender for Armenian Premier League club Pyunik.

Career
Born in Donetsk, Aussi is a product of the Donetsk Oblast youth sportive schools.

He played for Dynamo Kyiv in the Ukrainian Premier League Reserves and was never promoted to the senior squad team. From 2019 he is playing abroad: in the Czech Republic and in Belarus.

In summer 2022 he moved to Pyunik.

Personal life
His mother is a Ukrainian and his father is a Syrian, who arrived in Ukraine as a student.

References

External links 
 
 
 

2001 births
Living people
Footballers from Donetsk
Ukrainian footballers
Ukraine youth international footballers
Association football defenders
FC Dynamo Kyiv players
FC Slovan Liberec players
FC Torpedo-BelAZ Zhodino players
FC Pyunik players
Belarusian Premier League players
Ukrainian expatriate footballers
Expatriate footballers in the Czech Republic
Expatriate footballers in Belarus
Expatriate footballers in Armenia
Ukrainian expatriate sportspeople in the Czech Republic
Ukrainian expatriate sportspeople in Belarus
Ukrainian expatriate sportspeople in Armenia
Syrian Kurdish people
Ukrainian people of Syrian descent
NK Veres Rivne players